Contrasts is an album by American jazz saxophonist Sam Rivers featuring performances recorded in 1979 and released on the ECM label.

Reception
The Allmusic review by Scott Yanow awarded the album 4 stars stating "The seven Rivers originals, although sometimes having colorful melodies, are quite complex. However, the intriguing and very alert interplay between the brilliant musicians makes the music seem fairly logical and worth exploring by adventurous listeners".

Track listing 
All compositions by Sam Rivers
 "Circles" - 4:10 
 "Zip" - 4:42 
 "Solace" - 6:54 
 "Verve" - 7:09 
 "Dazzle" - 9:12 
 "Images" - 3:48 
 "Lines" - 7:15
Recorded at Tonstudio Bauer in Ludwigsburg, Germany in December 1979

Personnel 
 Sam Rivers - tenor saxophone, soprano saxophone, flute
George E. Lewis - trombone
Dave Holland - bass
Thurman Barker - drums, marimba

References 

ECM Records albums
Sam Rivers (jazz musician) albums
1980 albums